Black Faith is the fourth album by British death metal band Cancer. It was released in 1995 by East West and distributed worldwide. The record received decidedly mixed reviews; some compared the Black Faith material to mid-period Metallica, whilst others considered it a "poor man's Heartwork".

Track listing
All Songs Written by Cancer, except where noted.
 "Ants (Nemesis Ride)" 4:59
 "Who Do You Think You Are" 4:38
 "Face To Face" 3:52
 "Without Cause" 6:10
 "White Desire" 3:08
 "Kill Date" 4:15
 "Temple Song" 2:32
 "Black Faith" 3:15
 "Highest Orders" 4:43
 "Space Truckin'" (Deep Purple cover; written by Ian Gillan, Ritchie Blackmore, Jon Lord, Roger Glover & Ian Paice) 4:31
 "Sunburnt" 1:23
 "Save Me From Myself" 3:27

Personnel
John Walker: Acoustic & Rhythm Guitars, Vocal
Barry Savage: Lead Guitars
Ian Buchanan: Bass
Carl Stokes: Drums, Percussion

References

Cancer (band) albums
1995 albums